Wibe is a Norwegian surname. Notable people with the name include:

 Christian Wibe (born 1981), Norwegian composer
 Ellen Wibe (born 1965), Norwegian communications worker
 Håkon Wibe-Lund (born 1980), Norwegian football defender
 Pernille Wibe (born 1988), Norwegian handball player
 Sören Wibe (1946–2010), Swedish economist
 Terje Wibe (born 1947), Norwegian chess player

Norwegian-language surnames